Edward Bitanywaine Rugumayo (born 18 December 1934) is a Ugandan politician, diplomat, author, academic and environmentalist. He has previously served as cabinet minister in three Ugandan administrations. From 1979 until 1980, Rugumayo served as the Chairman of the Uganda Legislative Council. He currently serves as the chancellor of two Ugandan universities. He is a botanist and a community leader.

History
Rugumayo was born in Kyenjojo District, then known as Mwenge County, on 18 December 1934.

Education
He attended Mukole Primary School in Kyenjojo District from P1 to P4. He then attended Galihuma Primary School from P5 to P6. For S1 to S3, he attended Kabarole Junior Secondary School, and for S4 to S6, he attended Nyakasura School, in Fort Portal. He was admitted to Makerere University in the mid 1950s, but he quit when the university did not offer him the course he wanted; he was offered Agriculture, but he wanted Medicine. He was offered a scholarship to go and study in the United States of America, but was denied a passport by the British Colonial Administration. Instead, in 1958, they gave him a scholarship to study in the United Kingdom. He studied for the Diploma in Education at Chester College, then a constituent college of the University of Liverpool. He then studied at the University of London, where he graduated with the degree of Bachelor of Science in Botany and Ecology.

Political career
When Rugumayo returned to Uganda in 1966, he taught briefly at Kyambogo before joining Makerere University, as the warden of Mitchell Hall, one of the halls of residence. In 1971, Idi Amin successfully led a coup d'état against the Obote I administration. Rugumayo was appointed Minister of Education, through connections with his friend Wanume Kibedi, a lawyer, with whom they had studied in London and who was an in-law to Idi Amin. Kibedi was appointed Minister of Foreign Affairs. In February 1973, one year and eight months on the job, Rugumayo resigned from Amin's cabinet; the first member of the cabinet to resign. He went into exile in Nairobi, Kenya and Lusaka, Zambia, staying there until 1979, when Amin's regime was toppled.

After the Uganda National Liberation Army (UNLA) and the Uganda National Liberation Front (UNLF) captured power in Kampala, with the assistance of the Tanzania People's Defence Force (TPDF), Rugumayo was appointed chairman of the National Consultative Council (NCC), the parliament of the time. Rugumayo was instrumental in removing Yusuf Lule from power, when Lule disagreed with the NCC on procedural protocol when making cabinet appointments. Lule was replaced by Godfrey Binaisa. In May 1980, while Rugumayo was in Arusha, Tanzania, the Binaisa administration was also deposed in another coup d'état. This time Rugumayo stayed in exile until 1992. That year, he returned to Uganda and joined the National Resistance Movement administration of Yoweri Museveni.

Academic and political appointments
He has formerly held the following positions in the Ugandan Government, International Organizations and Universities:
 As Senior Science Inspector of Schools, while teaching at the Institute of Teacher Education, Kyambogo; now part of Kyambogo University, from 1968 until 11969. 
 As Warden of Mitchell Hall, and lecturer, Department of Education, Makerere University, from 1970 until 1971.
 As Minister of Education from June 1971 until February 1973 under Idi Amin
 As Senior Lecturer, then Associate Professor and then Dean, School of Education at the University of Zambia, between 1973 and 1979 
 As Chairman of the National Consultative Council from April 1979 until May 1980
 As Senior Consultant on Environmental Education; Training and Project Design for UNEP, UNDP, UNESCO, World Bank and other NGOs based in Nairobi. 
 As Visiting Professor of Environment at Oklahoma State University and Moscow State University
 As Chairperson of a 12-person team of consultants hired to establish the School of Environmental Studies at Moi University in Kenya, in 1989.
 As Visiting UNDP/UNEP Professor of Environment at Moi University.
 As Senior Programme Coordinator of Environment Liaison Centre International, a global coalition of environment NGOs based in Nairobi, from June 1992 until May 1995.
 As Chief Technical Advisor on Environment to with the Government of Lesotho, from July 1995 to July 1996, assigned by the United Nations Development Programme (UNDP).
 As Uganda's first Ambassador to South Africa from 1996 until 1999 
 As Minister of Internal Affairs from 199 until 2000
 As Minister of Tourism, Trade and Industry, from 2000 until 2005.

In 2005, during a cabinet reshuffle, Rugumayo was appointed Uganda's ambassador to France, a position which he turned down.

Other considerations
It is the only other botanical gardens in Uganda, other than the government-owned Entebbe Botanical Gardens in Entebbe, on the shores of Lake Victoria.

See also
 Parliament of Uganda
 Cabinet of Uganda
 Kyenjojo District
 New Vision

References

External links
Leadership Profile: Uganda Minister of Tourism, Trade and Industry: Honorable Edward Bitanywaine Rugumayo, Professor

1934 births
Living people
People from Kyenjojo District
Toro people
Western Region, Uganda
Alumni of the University of London
Alumni of the University of Liverpool
Government ministers of Uganda
National Resistance Movement politicians
Ugandan diplomats
High Commissioners of Uganda to South Africa